Indi Raja, also known as Indi Raja tusker, is an Indian elephant. The tusker is one of the main casket bearers of the Kandy Esala Perahera, an annual procession held to pay homage to the Sacred Tooth Relic of Buddha, at the Temple of the Tooth in Kandy, Sri Lanka, in which he carried the main casket for most number of times. He is also the leading tusker of the elephant troop at the Temple of the Tooth.

History
The tusker is known to born in 1980s in India. The tusker was gifted to the Temple of the Tooth by Former Prime Minister of India Rajiv Gandhi to then President Chandrika Bandaranaike at a solemn ceremony in July 1987. Indi Raja was only 6 years when he was gifted to Sri Lanka. In his younger days, Indi raja was known to be docile though playful. He is the second most senior elephant in Dalada Maligawa troop after Janaraja.

Perahera procession
When there were no tusked elephants to carry the main casket in 2009, Indiraja got the opportunity to carry the main casket for 10 days of the Perahera. Since then Indiraja carried the casket of the Sacred Tooth Relic in the Esala Perahera for more than 20 years. In 2014, Indiraja was attacked by an elephant on a side at the corner of Kotugodella Street. However, he walked to the Temple of the Tooth carrying the casket without being aggressive.

In August 2019, the tusker fallen ill during the first kumbal Esala perahera.

Rampage
In 2004, Raja suddenly attacked the fellow mahout Vijaya. The incident occurred at Vilbawa in the Kurunegala district on the banks of a tank where the elephants had been relaxing before the Day Perahera of Vilbawe Paththini Devala. The mahout was rushed to the Kurunegala Hospital in critical condition. Later he was transferred to the Kandy Hospital but died two days without regaining consciousness. After the incident, Indi raja was kept in chains with another Maligawa tusker Sinharaja. At that time, he broke the chains and charged at Sinharaja and pierced Sinharaja's mouth. Then Indiraja was sedated for a few days.

See also
 List of individual elephants

References

Individual elephants
Individual animals in Sri Lanka
Elephants in Sri Lanka